= El Paso Polychrome =

El Paso Polychrome is a type of pottery believed to have been produced by Native Americans in the Hueco basin near El Paso, Texas, between 1200 and 1600. The pottery comes in the form of jars, bowls and occasionally animal forms colored red, black or brown. Often the pieces were given a thin reddish wash, and featured paintings of simple geometric patterns.
